The Bilingual Research Journal is a triannual peer-reviewed academic journal covering bilingualism. The journal was established in 1975 and is published by Routledge. The current editors-in-chief are Dr. María E. Fránquiz and Emeritus Professor Alba A. Ortiz from the University of Texas at Austin. The Associate Editor is Dr. Gilberto P. Lara from the University of Texas at San Antonio.

See also
National Association for Bilingual Education

External links

Works about bilingualism
Publications established in 1975
Multilingual journals
Routledge academic journals
Triannual journals
Linguistics journals